Bryan Joseph Conquest (20 July 1930 – 2 January 2018) was an Australian politician. Born in Quilpie, Queensland, he was a managing director and Bundaberg City Councillor before entering politics. In 1984, he was elected to the Australian House of Representatives as the National member for the new notionally Labor seat of Hinkler. Conquest was defeated in 1987.

References

National Party of Australia members of the Parliament of Australia
Members of the Australian House of Representatives for Hinkler
Members of the Australian House of Representatives
1930 births
2018 deaths
20th-century Australian politicians